Loghain Mac Tir is a fictional character from BioWare's Dragon Age franchise. He hails from the kingdom of Ferelden, a realm in the world of Thedas, where the Dragon Age series is set. Loghain first appears in the 2009 novel The Stolen Throne as one of its main characters alongside his friend, King Maric Theirin. The novel's story is set during their youth, where Loghain served as Maric's right hand during Ferelden's war against the Orlesian Empire. He would next appear in The Calling, eleven years after King Maric and his companions ventured into the Deep Roads as described in The Stolen Throne, and eight years after the rebellion led by Prince Maric managed to liberate Ferelden from the Orlesians.

He made his video game debut in Dragon Age: Origins, which was released shortly after the release of The Calling, as one of the video game's main antagonists. Depending on the player's choices in Origins, Loghain may appear in a cameo role in the expansion for Origins, Dragon Age: Origins – Awakening, as well as a supporting role in Dragon Age: Inquisition.  He is voiced by Simon Templeman for all media.

His critical reception has been positive, with attention drawn to his effectiveness as a compelling and morally complex villain who many players could empathize with.

Character overview
Loghain is depicted as a war hero and a patriot, revered by many common folk in Ferelden. He inspires intense loyalty among those who serve under him. If the player recruits Loghain as a party member and spends time interacting with him, he would articulate his reasons for doubting the veracity of the Blight and reveal his suspicion of the Grey Warden's presence as being merely part of a scheme from Ferelden's former colonizers, the Orlesian Empire. He possesses a "strong sense of honour", albeit with a "ruthless" streak. After King Maric vanished during a sea journey and is presumed dead, Loghain became responsible for defending Ferelden and guiding Maric's naive son and successor to the throne, Cailan Theirin. His daughter, Anora would eventually be married to Cailan.

Creation and development 

Loghain was the first character to be created during the development cycle for Origins. In an interview with PC Gamer, Origins lead writer Gaider describes Loghain's characterization as part of the general shift toward a more morally ambiguous form of RPG. He explained that “a lot of Dragon Age was us at BioWare reacting to things we did or didn’t like about Dungeons & Dragons as a game system or a setting, so I’d say the effort to move to something more morally grey was intentional. Good people are capable of terribly evil things, and terrible people are capable of great good”. Loghain's relatable motives are an intentional design choice, allowing for the possibility that a player might be able to see from his perspective and judge him as simply being misguided. Gaider considers Loghain to be his favorite villain in the Dragon Age series because he sympathized with the character's position, noting that villains who perceive themselves as the good guy are the ones that intrigue him the most. He described Loghain as a tragic figure, and he considers the decision to potentially kill him especially poignant when there is a viable option to redeem the character.

Appearances

In video games
Loghain is first encountered at the fortress of Ostagar in Origins, as a general who provides strategies for King Cailan Theirin in the defense of Ferelden from the invading Darkspawn, a race of humanoid tainted creatures that mostly dwell in the underground of Thedas. As the Teyrn commanding the army, Loghain is responsible for devising the tactics that will be used in the Battle of Ostagar. Loghain's plan utilizes the hammer and anvil tactic; the Grey Wardens are to act as the anvil, drawing the main Darkspawn horde out, upon which Loghain's troops would rush forward and surround them from behind. The signal for Loghain's attack would be given by a beacon atop the dilapidated Tower of Ishal, which would be lit when the Darkspawn are fully committed in their attack on the Wardens.

Although Loghain advises him not to fight on the front lines, Cailan refuses to listen and insists on accompanying the Wardens. Cailan also insists on having the two newest Grey Wardens, the player character and Alistair, light the beacon. Although this was done, Loghain orders his army to leave the field instead, leaving both the King and the Grey Wardens to die. For the majority of the game from then on, Loghain takes up residence in Denerim and appoints himself regent to Queen Anora, becoming the de facto ruler of Ferelden. He uses the Grey Wardens as a scapegoat, blaming defeat at Ostagar on the Wardens; he simultaneously outlaws the Grey Wardens in Ferelden, putting a price on the head of any survivors and closing the border to Warden reinforcements from Orlais. He also demands that Ferelden's nobility submit to his rule. The nobility, either disbelieving Loghain's explanation of the disaster at Ostagar or feeling that, given his common birth and the alacrity with which he had taken the regency in the aftermath of Cailan's death, Loghain was opportunistically grabbing a throne he had no claim to, refused to acknowledge Loghain's authority and demanded that he resign the regency. Loghain refuses to do so and his heavy-handed tactics to force the people to fall into line instigates a civil war between his forces and those of Ferelden's nobility.

Loghain may join the player's party as a secret companion character late in the game. After the player and Loghain duel each other during the Landsmeet event, the player may choose to either have Loghain executed for his crimes or recruited into the Grey Wardens. Allowing Loghain to live will result in Alistair leaving the party in disgust, and will allow Loghain to take his place in the party. Choosing to have Loghain killed will result in Alistair staying, but Anora will refuse to marry whoever killed her father. It is possible if the player has hardened Alistair through his personal quest to have Alistair still marry Anora and rule as king while keeping Loghain alive, in this path Loghain still replaces him as a party member. Loghain is aware the Joining was meant to be a death sentence, and is willing to sacrifice himself to kill the Archdemon, seeing it as a way of making amends for his mistakes. At the conclusion of this story path, the player may sacrifice either their protagonist or Loghain to slay the Archdemon, or in the alternative the Grey Warden characters may survive the death of the Archdemon if one of them participates in Morrigan's ritual.

Loghain makes a small cameo appearance in Dragon Age: Origins – Awakening should he survive the events of Origins,  he informs the player character he is being sent by the Grey Wardens to serve in Orlais by order of the senior Grey Warden leadership; if the player married Anora, he will make a number of related comments, including suggesting plans for an heir and admonishing the player to treat his daughter well.

In Dragon Age II, Loghain's actions at the Battle of Ostagar were mentioned briefly by the story's narrator, Varric Tethras.

Loghain may make a further appearance as a supporting character in Dragon Age: Inquisition, should he survive the events of Origins and joins the Grey Wardens. He is presented as an ally of the Inquisition alongside Hawke, the protagonist of Dragon Age II, while they attempt to investigate corruption within the ranks of the Grey Warden Order. If Loghain participates in the ritual with Morrigan in Origins, she will conceive a child with him; Loghain may encounter his young son in Inquisition.

Other appearances
Loghain's origin story is told in Dragon Age: The Stolen Throne, which takes place more than thirty years before the events of the Origins. During the Orlesian occupation, Loghain's father refused to pay the tax collectors a tribute tax levied on all of Ferelden landholders by the Orlesian emperor, and was accused of tax evasion. One day the Orlesian soldiers seized the farmhold, and Loghain and his father were forced to watch as Orlesian troops raped and killed his mother. After murdering the Orlesian commander responsible, Loghain's father took him and fled into the Fereldan wilds, banding together with other desperate Ferelden's to eke out a living however they could. While living with a band of outlaws, Loghain met Maric, though he was not initially aware of Maric's lineage. When the Orlesian forces caught up with them, his father sacrificed himself to save Maric after charging Loghain with his safety. They pass through the Korcari Wilds, and meets the mysterious Witch of the Wilds, who enables them to pass through the Wilds safely. She provides this help on the condition that Maric makes her a promise; the specifics of this promise are unknown. She also prophesied to Maric that a Blight will one day come to Ferelden and gives him a cryptic warning about Loghain: "Keep him close and he will betray you, each time worse than the last". The duo successfully escape the wilds and joins Maric's rebel army. Over the course of the rebellion, Loghain became one of Maric's closest friends, as well as a key military advisor of the rebel cause. His strategies and tactics were responsible for many of the rebels' greatest victories. Afterwards Loghain led the Ferelden forces at the critical Battle of River Dane and was rewarded for his leadership by being made Teyrn of Gwaren. The Ferelden resistance eventually drove the Orlesian Empire out of their homeland completely.

In the sequel to The Stolen Throne, Dragon Age: The Calling, Loghain continued to support King Maric in the years after the passing of Queen Rowan, the sister of Eamon and Teagan Guerrin and mother to Cailan Theirin. It is revealed that Loghain had long been suspicious of the Grey Wardens; the Order was previously exiled from the realm centuries before due to a power struggle for the Ferelden throne, and he perceives the organization to be in league with Orlais. After Maric vanished following a meeting with the Wardens and the First Enchanter of the Orlesian Circle of Magi, Loghain deployed the Ferelden army to search for Maric while he spied on the Orlesians, certain that they would be betrayed. Two days after a tower named Kinhold Hold was taken over by Orlesian mages and templars who allied with a Darkspawn leader, Loghain led an assault on Kinloch Hold through Lake Calenhad. The attack was successful and Loghain was surprised when he found Maric in the tower as well. Loghain believed the plot was the doing of the Grey Wardens and felt Maric made a mistake in continuing to trust them. He disapproved when Maric indicated that he has allowed the Wardens to return to Ferelden, as they were previously exiled from Ferelden for hundreds of years by a previous King of Ferelden, and re-establish their order there on a permanent basis. Loghain did not speak to Maric the entire trip back to Denerim until they parted ways. At that point, Loghain only said, “There will be no Blight, Maric”.

In 2010, Loghain was included in DC Unlimited's range of Dragon Age themed video game figures, along with Duncan, Morrigan, and a Genlock.

Reception

Loghain was acclaimed for his appearance in Origins. In their December 2010 issue, Game Informer ranked Loghain as #9 in their "Top 30 Characters Who Defined A Decade" list. A special edition podcast was later uploaded which provides insider's look into how the list came to be, where the editors discussed the selections, and some of the internal debates they had in selecting the list. Jeff Cork, writing for Game Informer, said Loghain "is more than just the one-dimensional traitorous scum players had been led to believe. Late in the game we learn more about his motivations for betraying the Grey Wardens (and the player), and they actually make sense. Rather than the power-mad general we’d been set up to expect, he’s actually a fiercely loyal leader desperate to keep his nation safe". In a later editorial published in 2014, the managing editor of Game Informer, Matt Bertz, singled out Loghain as the best character in Origins and said he loved "the shades of gray BioWare used to paint this protector of the realm who always thought he was doing to right thing even when that took him down some dark roads". IGN ranks Loghain's betrayal as #83 on their top 100 list of unforgettable video game moments. IGN's Christian Holt considers Loghain's betrayal at Ostagar to be a great plot starter, setting the player character on a course for much of the remaining game to gather allies against both the darkspawn and Loghain's forces. He notes that, "like a true Bioware game, the player later gets to decide Loghain's fate, concluding "Was he a sniveling coward or intelligent for not entering a hopeless battle? Were the Grey Wardens too powerful? Should he be executed or allowed to redeem himself? It’s all set up by Loghain’s actions at Ostagar in the game’s first hours".

Rick Lane of PC Gamer named Loghain as one of the superb examples of human villains in gaming. He explains that many of Loghain's actions are undoubtedly evil, but motivating them are visibly human emotions of fear, conviction, and love for his daughter. He noted that this kind of flexibility in a villain's character and how the player can respond to it is entirely unique to the interactive nature of a video game, and commented that some developers favor deceiving players with narrative tricks as a key part of their strategy to making certain characters “feel villainous". Lane praised Dragon Age for going further than most video games, by allowing the player to make a final judgement on Loghain. Cobbett, in an article written for Eurogamer in 2016, praised the complexity of Loghain's character as an example of a high level of writing care and attention. In a later article written in 2017 for Rock, Paper, Shotgun, Cobbett named Loghain as the most successful example of a sympathetic villain in a role playing game that he could think of. He observed that Loghain comes across like a villain "who spends most of the game up to his gauntlets in dodgy dealings", but noted that a much more rounded figure emerges should the player recruit him. He notes that once Loghain discovers that only a blood sacrifice to slay the Archdemon, the draconic leader of the Darkspawn horde, would save Ferelden from the Blight, "he's also the first to volunteer immediately, having realized his mistakes and is looking for a way to atone".

Sam Roberts of GamesRadar share the same sentiments: Loghain being the only notable antagonist in Origins, has his reasons for being the way he is and the player have the opportunity to unravel them. He noted that characters like Loghain are better than the actual story due to the well written dialogue, whereas he found the overarching narrative to be difficult for him to get invested in. Keri Honea of PlayStation Lifestyle drew reference to the tie-in novels for Origins, The Stolen Throne and The Calling, when discussing Loghain's actions and motivations in Origins. She considers the novels essential reading in order to fully understand his character, and claims that she no longer feels a visceral hatred for the character after reading the novels.

Josh Straub of Game Informer,  in a retrospective article about Origins, commented that Loghain's choices as the primary antagonist means that the player will have to choose between avenging the death of Duncan and forgiving Loghain in favor of strengthening the forces of Ferelden. He observed that not only was Loghain's actions at the Battle of Ostagar important to the beginning of Origins, it is integral to shaping the identity of the entire Dragon Age franchise, further noting that the events of Dragon Age II was set into motion as a result of the outcome of the Battle of Ostagar.

References

Dictator characters in video games
Dragon Age characters
Fantasy video game characters
Fictional commanders
Fictional defectors
Fictional lords and ladies
Fictional military personnel in video games
Fictional regicides
Fictional revolutionaries
Fictional swordfighters in video games
Fictional war veterans
Male video game villains
Video game bosses
Video game characters introduced in 2009
Nobility characters in video games
Video game sidekicks